Seizure threshold 2 homolog is a protein that in humans is encoded by the SZT2 gene.

Function 

The protein encoded by this gene is expressed in the brain, predominantly in the parietal and frontal cortex as well as in dorsal root ganglia. It is localized to the peroxisome, and is implicated in resistance to oxidative stress. It likely functions by increasing superoxide dismutase (SOD) activity, but itself has no direct SOD activity. Studies in mice show that this gene confers low seizure threshold, and may also enhance epileptogenesis.

Clinical significance 

Mutations in this gene have been shown to cause infantile encephalopathy with epilepsy and dysmorphic corpus callosum.

References

Further reading 

 
 
 

Human proteins